Camillien Houde  (August 13, 1889 – September 11, 1958) was a Quebec politician, a Member of Parliament, and a four-time mayor of Montreal. He is of the few Canadian politicians to have served at all three levels of government.

Political career
Houde was born in Montreal on August 13, 1889 and died there on September 11, 1958. He was nicknamed "l'imprévisible"—the unpredictable. He was the only surviving child of Azade Houde and Josephine Frenette. He is descended from the first Houde ancestor, Louis Houde, who came from Manou, Eure-et-Loir, France to New France in 1647. Louis Houde's son was Louis H. who married Marie Lemay in 1685.

He was first elected to the Legislative Assembly of Quebec as a member of the Conservative Party for the riding of Montréal–Sainte-Marie in the 1923 election. He was defeated in the 1927 election, but re-elected in a by-election on October 24, 1928.  He was elected leader of the Conservative Party on July 10, 1929, led the party to defeat in the 1931 election, and failed to win a seat in Montréal–Saint-Jacques after vacating his previous seat. He resigned as Conservative leader on September 19, 1932.

When George VI and Queen Elizabeth visited Montreal on the 1939 royal tour of Canada and were greeted by cheering crowds, Houde turned to the King and said: "You know, Your Majesty, some of this is for you."

He moved to federal politics and lost in a bid for election as a Conservative candidate for the House of Commons of Canada in a 1938 by-election in the Montreal riding of St. Mary. In 1940, he was arrested and charged under the Defence of Canada Regulations. He was imprisoned at Camp Petawawa in Ontario until the end of the war. He ran again in St. Mary, this time as an independent candidate, in the 1945 federal election, but was again defeated. He won a seat as an independent candidate in the riding of Papineau in the 1949 federal election by less than 100 votes. He did not run for re-election in the 1953 election.

Houde became a figure of ridicule in parts of English Canada because of his conduct in opposition to conscription. During the 1949 federal election, the Toronto Star, which openly supported the Liberal Party, attempted to link the unpopular Houde with George Drew, then leader of the Progressive Conservative Party of Canada even though Houde was running as an independent candidate against an official Progressive Conservative candidate. The Star accused Drew of making a secret pact with Quebec Premier Maurice Duplessis to appoint Houde to the Cabinet as Drew's Quebec lieutenant should the Tories win the election. The newspaper's campaign reached its culmination the Saturday before the election with a banner front-page headline reading:

(in later editions, the last line was changed to "VOTE ST. LAURENT").

Concurrent to his career in provincial and federal politics, Houde was mayor of Montreal from 1928 to 1932, from 1934 to 1936, from 1938 to 1940, and from 1944 to 1954.

World War II controversy
During World War II, Houde campaigned against conscription. On August 2, 1940, Houde publicly urged the men of Quebec to ignore the national registration measure introduced by the federal government. Three days later, he was placed under arrest by the Royal Canadian Mounted Police on charges of sedition, and then confined without trial in internment camps in Petawawa, Ontario and Ripples, New Brunswick for four years. Upon his release on August 18, 1944, he was greeted by a cheering crowd of 50,000 Montrealers, and won back his job as Montreal mayor in 1944's civic election.

Honours

Houde was made Chevalier of the Légion d'honneur and Commander of the Order of the British Empire in 1935 and an Officer of the Order of St John in 1953.

Legacy
On his death in 1958, Camillien Houde was interred in the Cimetière Notre-Dame-des-Neiges in Montreal, Quebec in an Italian marble replica of Napoleon's tomb.

Mayor Houde was a reform-minded mayor in the areas of patronage, unemployment, and organized crime. He was also responsible for some of the major public park improvements in Montreal including the park on Mont Royal with its man-made lake and park facilities.  "Camilliennes" were public washrooms built by Houde during the Great Depression.

After his death, Mayor Jean Drapeau named a new road over Mount Royal after Houde, an act many considered ironic, as Houde and many others had long opposed building roads over the city's famous mountain.

Other information
Mayor Houde threw a party for the then-new fellowship of Alcoholics Anonymous, which was described by Bill W in the book Alcoholics Anonymous Comes of Age as "probably the first official reception that any A.A. group ever had."

See also

Politics of Quebec
List of Quebec general elections
List of Quebec leaders of the Opposition
Timeline of Quebec history
Conscription Crisis of 1944

References

Further reading

External links

 Bibliothèque et Archives Nationales du Québec: Fonds Camillien Houde 
 Répertoire des fonds d'archives de parlementaires québécois - Camillien Houde 
 City of Montreal - Camillien Houde
 Camillien Houde (1889-1958): Homme politique 
New Brunswick Internment Camp Museum - Internees Phase II (1941 - 1945)

|-

1889 births
1958 deaths
Independent MPs in the Canadian House of Commons
Mayors of Montreal
Conservative Party of Quebec MNAs
Members of the House of Commons of Canada from Quebec
Quebec political party leaders
Canadian Commanders of the Order of the British Empire
Chevaliers of the Légion d'honneur
Burials at Notre Dame des Neiges Cemetery